HMV Canada Ltd. was a Canadian entertainment retailer, owned by Hilco. The company was originally a subsidiary of HMV in the United Kingdom until it was sold to Hilco Capital in 2011. HMV itself would later be bought by Hilco in 2013. HMV Canada's head office was located in Etobicoke. The retailer ceased operations in Spring 2017.

History
HMV Canada was established in 1986 by the purchase of the Mister Sound chain by EMI Music Canada. Stores in the country did not have rights to the "His Master's Voice" trademark, as it was owned by Technicolor SA and licensed out. HMV Canada's application for use of the trademark was abandoned in 2010. Though the initials "HMV" came from the His Master's Voice trademark, HMV was not prevented from using its initials in Canada. In some radio and television commercials in the 1990s, HMV Canada used "HMV" as an acronym for "hot music values".

The flagship store, which opened in 1991 at 333 Yonge Street in Toronto, "turned music shopping into a department-store experience" with its "multiple levels, escalators and specialty sections", contrasting to the smaller stores of its rivals Sam's, A&A, and Sunrise in the vicinity. The flagship store was notable for hosting a number of in-store concerts and other promotions. Bands that performed in the store included Puff Daddy, D'Angelo, Green Day, Foxy Brown, Red Hot Chili Peppers (in an outdoor concert that shut down the Yonge and Edward Street intersection), Ramones, Guns N' Roses, Backstreet Boys, NSYNC and Mariah Carey. The Yonge Street store was also notable for promoting local indie music scene by giving unsigned bands prominent shelf space on the ground floor as well as hosting in-store concerts and events with Toronto bands.
HMV also occupied a two-level, 20,000 square foot store in West Edmonton Mall which included an event stage (known as the Phase IV Stage) in front of the store. The Phase IV Stage often hosted musical performances or autograph signings by artists who were making tour stops in Edmonton. The space is now occupied by Sunrise Records.

In 2005, HMV Canada took over a Virgin Megastore in Vancouver, allowing it to own, "Canada's largest store dedicated to music and DVD".

In the two decades to 2006, HMV was awarded "Canadian Music Retailer of the Year".

In June 2010, HMV Canada launched purehmv, a customer rewards program that offered store discounts and exclusive items across music, film, and gaming in exchange for points gained in-store. Over 300,000 customers joined the program in its first four months.

In June 2011, HMV sold its Canadian stores for £2 million to Hilco UK, a firm specialising in retail restructuring.

On November 3, 2011, HMV announced its flagship store in Downtown Vancouver would close in January 2012, that a smaller location would open in a different area of Downtown Vancouver in the future, and the location in Richmond Centre would close.

As of late 2012, Hilco was successful at restructuring HMV Canada and there were no plans to cease operations despite rumours stating otherwise. Under CEO Nick Williams, HMV Canada focused on growing back-catalogue music and movies not found at discount rivals, while also carrying higher-margin merchandise like gifts, collectibles, clothing and headphones, while ditching video games and technology hardware. By contrast, former parent HMV Group remained under pressure due to stronger online competition and continuing to sell low-margin video games and computers.

In 2012, HMV had 113 stores in Canada, down from 121 when it was sold by HMV Group. However, Hilco opened several new stores, such as the one in Peter Pond Mall in Fort McMurray.

Final years
By 2014, HMV's profits were declining, with Hilco citing online media consumption as a factor. As of 2017, the company had $39 million in debt, and Hilco stated that financial difficulties, combined with decreasing sales, meant the current situation was not sustainable. On January 27, 2017, HUK 10 Ltd., the shell company owned by Hilco employee, business partner of Nick Williams, and owner of HMV UK, Paul McGowan, sued HMV in the Ontario Superior Court. They were successful, and Hilco announced plans to close all HMV locations by April 30, 2017. HMV locations held clearout sales of their remaining inventory. The flagship store on Yonge Street in Toronto closed on April 14, 2017.

Ontario-based chain Sunrise Records bought the leases of 70 of HMV's locations in an effort to expand nationally, and invited 1,340 former HMV employees to apply for 700 positions. HMV's flagship location on Yonge Street in Toronto was one of the several locations that were not part of the deal and remained vacant.

On February 5, 2019, Sunrise Records subsequently announced its intent to buy the chain's UK parent company HMV Retail Ltd. out of administration from Hilco for an undisclosed amount, with the possibility of HMV Canada’s revival being considered.

References

Music retailers of Canada
Companies based in Etobicoke
Retail companies established in 1986
Retail companies disestablished in 2017
Defunct retail companies of Canada
Canadian companies established in 1986
Canadian companies disestablished in 2017